Peszek is a family name, originating from Poland. It may refer to:

 Samantha Peszek (born 1991), American artistic gymnast
 Maria Peszek (born 1973.), Polish singer
 Tom Peszek (born 1985), American rower
 Jan Peszek (born 1944), Polish actor

Polish-language surnames